Matthias Sention Sr. (also spelled Sangins, Sension, Senchion, and later as St. John) (August 9, 1601 – October 19, 1669) was a founding settler of Dorchester, Massachusetts, of Windsor, Connecticut, of Wethersfield, Connecticut and of Norwalk, Connecticut.

Matthias was the son of Christopher St. John (c. 1581 – June 19, 1629) and Joane (Nee?) St. John. He was the grandson of Thomas St. John, Esquire (1564–1625) and Jane Mathew and great-nephew to Sir William St. John, Knight of Highlight and his wife Eleanor (de Port-St. John) St. John of Lydiard Tregoze. He was the great-grandson of Christopher St. John, Esquire (1547–1616), Lord of Uchel-olau until his death, and his wife Elizabeth Bawdrip.

This St. John family came from a small, now abandoned, feudal village called Uchel-olau (High-light in English), Glamorganshire, Wales. Thomas St. John, Esquire removed to London after he was admitted to Gray's Inn, one of the four Inns of Court in 1577. Mathias' father, Christopher St. John was raised in London no later than 1584 and married about 1600. Matthias appears to be his first born child.

Sir William St. John, Knight his great uncle was a member of the Virginia Company of London and recorded in the early census records of Virginia. Sir William was back and forth between London and Colonial America until Matthias and his uncle Matthew came to America permanently. Sir William was a Vice Admiral in the English Royal Navy and had his own ships. Matthias' occupation as a chandler likely refers to ship chandler a service he probably provided for his great uncle, lord of Uchel-olau. Matthias and his uncle Matthew have been merged into 1 person in the 1907 St. John Genealogy book.

Settlement in Massachusetts Bay Colony 
He came to Dorchester, in the Massachusetts Bay Colony in 1632. He was named a freeman on September 3, 1634. He received a grant of twenty acres of land there on January 14, 1635. In 1638, he sold his house to a Mr. Withington, and in 1639, he sold his land to Withington too.

Settlement in Connecticut Colony 

He moved to Windsor, Connecticut Colony in 1640. He was granted land ten rods wide and 18 rods deep adjacent to the palisades (the protective fence of the settlement). In 1643 and 1644, he served as a member of a Grand jury.

Matthias is listed as a settler in Wethersfield as early as 1648. Jonas Weede sold Matthias his land in Wethersfield in 1640. On several occasions he served on a jury, and was also himself challenged in court in Hartford. In some cases, the issue was either a debt owed of or to him. On one occasion, he was brought before the court accused of selling "syder to Indians by which they was Drunke". On another occasion he won a judgment against Stephen Beckwith for defamation. In February 1658, Thomas Wickham bought Matthias' land in Wethersfield.

He moved to Norwalk in 1654. In 1657, he is recorded as working with Isacke More, and Edward Nash to "make and provide a good and sufficient wolfe-pit." The record states that Matthias was chosen in 1660, as a townsman "to act and agitate all such affairs and occasions as the orders of the court authoriseth and that for the Yere ensuinge."

He is listed on the Founders Stone bearing the names of the founding settlers of Norwalk in the East Norwalk Historical Cemetery.

Notable descendants 
Matthias Sension is the ancestor of many people with the surname St. John in America. The name was changed in the early 1700s.

John St. John (Governor of Kansas)
Matthias Sention Jr., founding settler of Norwalk
Mark Sension (1630–1693), deputy of the Connecticut General Assembly from Norwalk (1672, 1676, 1678, 1684)
Stephen St. John (1735–1785), member of the Connecticut House of Representatives from Norwalk (1778, 1780–1785)
Stephen St. John, member of the Connecticut House of Representatives from Norwalk (1805, 1806)
Frederick St. John Lockwood, member of the Connecticut House of Representatives from Norwalk (1865, 1866, 1872)

References

External links 
 St. John Family Website

1601 births
1669 deaths
American people of Welsh descent
American Puritans
Burials in East Norwalk Historical Cemetery
Founding settlers of Norwalk, Connecticut
Kingdom of England emigrants to Massachusetts Bay Colony
Matthias
People from the City of London